Kelly Shibari (born 9 September 1972) is an American former pornographic actress and plus-size model.

Early life
Shibari was born and raised in Japan. She moved to the United States at the age of 15. She has also lived in the Bay Ridge, Brooklyn and Hell's Kitchen, Manhattan neighborhoods of New York City. She speaks fluent Japanese and English.

Shibari does not have a high school diploma because she was admitted to college early at the age of 16. She graduated with a degree in marketing. She claims to have a Mensa-level IQ, but states that she is not interested in becoming a member of Mensa.

Shibari was once a roadie for rock bands and Broadway tours. She also worked for ten years as an art director and production designer for mainstream films and television shows and left that industry during the 2007–08 Writers Guild of America strike.

Career
Shibari entered the adult film industry in 2007 after sending photos of herself to The Score Group. She initially used the stage name Olivia when she was working in amateur pornography. The last name Shibari in her current stage name means Japanese rope bondage. In June 2014, she became the first plus-size model to appear on the cover of Penthouse Forum magazine.

Mainstream media appearances
Shibari appeared in the music video for the song "Mein Land" by Rammstein, which premiered on 11 November 2011. She also appeared in the series finale of Sons of Anarchy in 2014.

Awards and nominations

References

External links
 
 
 

1972 births
Japanese emigrants to the United States
Japanese female adult models
Japanese pornographic film actresses
Japanese pornographic film directors
Living people
Plus-size models
Women pornographic film directors